is a public park located in the Sayama hills and stretching from the city of Musashimurayama to the town of Mizuho in Tokyo, Japan. With an area of 1,323,900 m2, it is the second-largest park in the prefecture of Tokyo.

Overview
Noyamakita-Rokudōyama Park is located at the western end of Sayama Prefectural Natural Park. It is a combination of thick woods and a valley (a valley cut into a hill).

Access
 By train: 30 minutes’ walk from Hakonegasaki Station on the Hachikō Line (buses are available)

See also
 Parks and gardens in Tokyo
 National Parks of Japan

References

 Website of Sayama Parks

External links
 Website of Musashimurayama City (in Japanese)
Parks and gardens in Tokyo